Gustav George Lesnevich (February 22, 1915 – February 28, 1964) was an American boxer who held the World Light Heavyweight Championship.

Boxing career
Lesnevich was born and raised in Cliffside Park, New Jersey. He turned pro in 1934 and in 1939 took on World Light Heavyweight champion Billy Conn, but lost a decision. In 1941 he took on Anton Christoforidis, winning the NBA light heavyweight title by decision. Later that year he defended the title twice against Tami Mauriello, winning both decisions to become the undisputed light heavyweight champion. In 1948 he lost a decision to Freddie Mills along with his title recognition. In 1949 he took on Ezzard Charles, but was TKO'd in the 7th, and retired after the bout.

In addition to his various accolades, Lesnevich was named Ring Magazine Fighter of the Year in 1947.

Lesnevich served in the United States Coast Guard from 1943 to 1945.

Professional boxing record

See also
List of light heavyweight boxing champions

References

External links
 
 

|-

|-

1915 births
1964 deaths
Boxers from New Jersey
People from Cliffside Park, New Jersey
Sportspeople from Bergen County, New Jersey
United States Coast Guard enlisted
American male boxers
Light-heavyweight boxers
United States Coast Guard personnel of World War II